Johann Alexander Vera Tapia (December 4, 1995) better known as Johann Vera, is an internationally recognized singer, songwriter, and actor born in Guayaquil, Ecuador.

He started his career at 10 years old by participating in the RCN show Factor X alongside other prominent Colombian celebrities such as Camilo and Greeicy. His international career skyrocketed when he participated in La Banda, a reality TV-Show created by Ricky Martin and Simon Cowell. In both instances, he ended up in the finalists group which helped him grow his fanbase and better exploit his songwriting, singing and acting talent.

Working as an independent artist, he has released various hit singles such as “Donde Nací”, “Vuelo a París” and “Pretty Girl”, and appeared on TV Shows such as Disney Channel's Champeta, Nickelodeon's Club 57, Kally's Mash Up, among others.

On 2020, Johann represented Ecuador on the Viña del Mar International Song Festival, winning a "Gaviota de Plata" (Silver Seagull) award; The second ever received by an Ecuadorian artist.

Personal life 
Johann Alexander Vera Tapia was born on Guayaquil, December 4, 1995 to Jayo Vera and Shirley Tapia. He has a younger sister named Stephanie and an older brother named Christian. 

When Johann turned six, the family moved to Bogotá, where he lived for the next 10 years and met most of his lifelong friends. During his time in Colombia he participated on Factor X  and later joined MISI, a well known arts academy.

Graduating high school at 15 years old, he moved to the United States, where he could better pursue his life-long dream. Quickly, he had the opportunity to work as an extra on various TV shows and commercials; but his life changed on 2015 when he joined La Banda by Univisión. During his time on the show he was considered one of the audience's favorite contestants and ended up as a finalist which allowed him to remain in the public eye and release his #1 hit "Pretty Girl". Today, he is considered one of Ecuador's most internationally recognized artists.

Nowadays, he resides in Miami, Florida and remains working as an independent artist. He has been releasing music every year, acting and posting on his YouTube channel where he gathers more than 1 million subscribers.

Career 
Johann got started as a singer at the age of 9 on the RCN show "Factor X”, where his position as finalist, alongside Camilo and Greeicy, allowed him to access a scholarship to the famous MISI arts academy.

After moving to the US, he participated on the 2015 Univisión show “La Banda” where he worked with notorious singers such as Ricky Martin, Simon Cowell, Alejandro Sanz and Laura Pausini. Even though he was one of the audience’s favorites candidates, he did not win the show. But, his position as a finalist, allowed him to grow a fanbase that resulted in Johann having more followers than the show’s official social media accounts.

In August 2016, he released his first independent single and music video, "Pretty Girl (Tu Canción)". The video was mostly recorded in Los Angeles. Later in that year, he also released a single called "Tíralo" with the music video being recorded in Bogota, Colombia.In 2017, he released another single, this time with a more sentimental note: "Vuelo a París". The music video was recorded in New York City. That same year he released “Ojo por Ojo” on the day of his birthday.

In 2018 he released the song "Nervioso" with adjacent video recorded in Japan. That year he also became the first Ecuadorian artist to ever sing on an awards ceremony on the United States by releasing his single "Astronauta" on Univision's Premios Juventud.

In 2019 he followed up with "Ahogando". The music video was directed and produced by Vera himself. Being shot in various locations on the Ecuadorian coast, we can see the appearance of 2 notable Ecuadorian celebrities, Nathaly Quiñonez and Michela Pincay.

On February 13, 2020 he released "Perdón", which was the one chosen for him to sing on the Viña del Mar International Song Festival 2020, The largest Latin American Music Award. His performance awarded him a "Gaviota de Plata" (Silver Seagull) award. Later that year he released “En Donde Están”.  

On 2021, Johann released  “Me Tienes Mal” and “Inevitable”. The latter ended up on Ecuador's top charts for several weeks on that same year. Additionally, the music video was recorded alongside her longtime friend Paula Galindo (commonly known as Pautips) on their former school in Colombia. That same year, Johann finished up the taping of "Kally's Mashup ¡Un cumpleaños muy Kally!" and “Club 57”.

On 2022, Johann was inspired to create a new Ecuador inspired FIFA World Cup song that reached top charts on the country. “Donde Nací” was adopted by Ecuadorian fans as the unofficial team cheer in this year’s cup. The song has been used in thousands of TikTok and Instagram videos including some by influential Ecuadorian figures such as Guillermo Lasso. One of the most viral songs of the season.

Discography

Singles and EPs

Filmography

Television

Movies

Theatre

Awards and Nominations

References

External links 
 

1995 births
Living people
Latin pop musicians